These are the results of the Gymnastics at the 2021 Islamic Solidarity Games which took place between 10 and 18 August 2022 in Konya, Turkey.

Artistic – Men

Team
10 August

Individual all-around
10 August

Floor
10–11 August

Pommel horse
10–11 August

Rings
10–11 August

Vault
10–11 August

Parallel bars
10–11 August

Horizontal bar
10–11 August

Artistic – Women

Team
17 August

Individual all-around
17 August

Vault
17–18 August

Uneven bars
17–18 August

Balance beam
17–18 August

Floor
17–18 August

Rhythmic

Team
13 August

Hoop
13–14 August

Ball
13–14 August

Clubs
13–14 August

Ribbon
13–14 August

Group all-around
13 August

5 hoops
13–14 August

3 ribbons and 2 balls
13–14 August

Aerobic

Men's individual
13–14 August

Women's individual
13–14 August

Mixed pair
13–14 August

Trio
13–14 August

Team
13 August

References

External links 
Official website

2021 Islamic Solidarity Games